The following highways are numbered 799:

United States